John R. "Jack" Buckley (January 1, 1932 – January 21, 2020) was an American politician who served as Massachusetts Secretary of Administration and Finance from 1975 to 1979, member of the Massachusetts House of Representatives from 1965 to 1975, and Abington, Massachusetts Town Treasurer from 1961 to 1965. He was a candidate for state Democratic party chairman in 1971, but lost to State Treasurer Robert Q. Crane.

His son John R. Buckley, Jr. is the Plymouth County, Massachusetts Register of Deeds.

See also
 1955–1956 Massachusetts legislature

References

1932 births
2020 deaths
Harvard College alumni
People from Abington, Massachusetts
Massachusetts Secretaries of Administration and Finance
People from Rockland, Massachusetts
Democratic Party members of the Massachusetts House of Representatives
City and town treasurers in the United States